Brumunda is a river in Innlandet county, Norway. The river begins at the lake, just north of Høljemyra and continues in a southerly direction to the south of Bersbuseter. The river ends at Brumunddal where it flows into the lake Mjøsa a few kilometres north of the town of Hamar.

Brumunda serves as the border between Furnes and Veldre, and during the Middle Ages, it was the border between southern and northern Hedemarken. It still serves as the border between the southern and northern variants of the Hedmarksk dialect. North of the river people use ei and øy, while on the south side they say e and ø.

See also
List of rivers in Norway

References

Ringsaker
Rivers of Innlandet